Turnbo Creek is a stream in Webster County in the Ozarks of southern Missouri. It is a tributary of the James River.

Turnbo Creek has the name of the local Turnbo family. A variant name was "Turnbow Creek".

See also
List of rivers of Missouri

References

Rivers of Webster County, Missouri
Rivers of Missouri